Salles-Arbuissonnas-en-Beaujolais is a commune in the Rhône department in eastern France.

See also
Communes of the Rhône department

References

External links

 Vivre à Salles-Arbuissonnas en Beaujolais

Communes of Rhône (department)